Ogougouworo  is a village in the commune of Bassila in the Donga Department of western Benin.The geographical coordinates are 9°22'N 1°29'E.

External links
Satellite map at Maplandia

Populated places in the Donga Department
Commune of Bassila